Ferdinand de Gannes (31 January 1889 – 22 May 1971) was a Trinidadian cricketer. He played in fourteen first-class matches for Trinidad and Tobago from 1909 to 1923.

See also
 List of Trinidadian representative cricketers

References

External links
 

1889 births
1971 deaths
Trinidad and Tobago cricketers